La criada bien criada ("The Well-Made Maid") is a 1972 Mexican comedy film based on the television series of the same name. It was directed by Fernando Cortés and stars María Victoria and Guillermo Rivas.

Plot
Inocencia has left her pueblo to find a job at Mexico City. In Mexico City, Inocencia meets two men, a deliveryman and a postman, who fight for her love. The postman finds a babysitting job for Inocencia. Inocencia has to take care of Bebito, who is more "grown up" than she expected.

Cast
María Victoria as Inocencia
Chabelo as Bebito
Guillermo Rivas as the delivery man
Alejandro Suárez as the postman
Jorge Lavat
Arturo Castro
Alfonso Zayas
Joaquin Garcia Vargas "Borolas"

References

External links

Mexican comedy films
1972 comedy films
1972 films
Films based on television series
1970s Spanish-language films
1970s Mexican films